is a Japanese hip-hop rapper. He first appeared on the Japanese hip-hop scene in the 1990s, collaborating in a Shakkazombie song, "Tomo ni ikkou". Since 2002, he has released three albums: Hitman (2002), Diamond (2003), and The Force (2006).  Dabo's lyrics are more hard-edged than most J-pop, or Japanese pop, and represent a tough Japanese street culture. He also appears as a playable character in the Japanese version of Def Jam Vendetta.

Music career
He became a member of Nitro Microphone Underground in 1997. In 1999 he released his first single, Mr. Fudatzkee. In 2001, he was the first Japanese  artist to be signed by Def Jam Japan. That same year, he made his major debut as a solo artist releasing Platinum Tongue, which reached number fifteen on the Japanese (Oricon) music charts. In addition to his solo works, Dabo racked up numerous credits collaborating with various artists. In addition to his solo works, he has amassed more than 60 credits working with various artists.

Discography

References

External links
Def Jam Japan Artist Intro
Dabo Interview (Japanese)

Japanese rappers
Living people
1975 births
People from Noda, Chiba
Musicians from Chiba Prefecture
Place of birth missing (living people)